The American Journal of Hospice and Palliative Medicine is a peer-reviewed medical journal that covers the field of health care. The editor-in-chief is Robert E. Enck (East Tennessee State University). It was established in 1984 and is published by SAGE Publications.

Abstracting and indexing 
The journal is abstracted and indexed in Scopus and the Science Citation Index Expanded. According to the Journal Citation Reports, its 2018 impact factor is 1.655.

References

External links 
 

SAGE Publishing academic journals
English-language journals